Abu Sulayman Muhammad Sijistani, also called al-Mantiqi (the Logician) (c. 912 – c. 985 CE), named for his origins in Sijistan or Sistan province in present-day Eastern Iran and Southern Afghanistan, became the leading Persian Islamic humanist philosopher in Baghdad.

Deeply religious, he regarded both religion and philosophy as valid and true, but separate, concerned with different issues, and proceeding by different means.  He thus rejected the claims of the theologians employing Ilm al-Kalam as having built a theology "proved" by rationality and of the Brethren of Purity as offering a synthesis of philosophy and religion.

His best-known work is Siwān al-Ḥikma "Vessel of Wisdom", a history of philosophy from the beginning to his own time.

References 

 Al-Sijistani, Abu Sulayman Muhammad, in Edward Craig (ed, 1998), Routledge Encyclopedia of Philosophy vol. 8.  .

Further reading 
 

10th-century Iranian philosophers
Islamic philosophers
1000 deaths